The University of Toronto Press is a Canadian university press founded in 1901. Although it was founded in 1901, the press did not actually publish any books until 1911.

The press originally printed only examination books and the university calendar. Its first scholarly book was a work by a classics professor at University College, Toronto. The press took control of the university bookstore in 1933. It employed a novel typesetting method to print issues of the Canadian Journal of Mathematics, founded in 1949. 

Sidney Earle Smith, president of the University of Toronto in the late 1940s and 1950s, instituted a new governance arrangement for the press modelled on the governing structure of the university as a whole (on the standard Canadian university governance model defined by the Flavelle commission). Henceforth, the press's business affairs and editorial decision-making would be governed by separate committees, the latter by academic faculty. A committee composed of Vincent Bladen, George Williams Brown (general editor of the press from 1951), and A. S. P. Woodhouse studied the publishing policies of American university presses to inform the structure of the press's publishing division. 

Beginning in 1971, the press printed its books simultaneously on paper and microfiche. 

The press is currently a member of the Association of University Presses.

See also
 Dictionary of Canadian Biography
 University of Toronto Press Publications

References

Sources

External links

 
 

University of Toronto
University presses of Canada
Publishing companies established in 1901
1901 establishments in Ontario
Canadian companies established in 1901